Temnopteryx phalerata, also known by the common name Cape zebra cockroach, is a species from the genus Temnopteryx.

References

cockroaches
Insects described in 1864